The 2022 Liberty Flames football team represented Liberty University in the 2022 NCAA Division I FBS football season. The Flames played their home games at Williams Stadium in Lynchburg, Virginia, and competed as an FBS independent. They were led by fourth-year head coach Hugh Freeze.

The 2022 season was the program's last season as an independent as the Flames will join Conference USA in 2023.

Schedule
Liberty hosted six home games and travelled to six away games.

Coaching staff

Game summaries

at Southern Miss

UAB

at No. 19 Wake Forest

Akron

at Old Dominion

Statistics

at UMass

Gardner-Webb

BYU

at Arkansas

at UConn

Virginia Tech

New Mexico State

vs. Toledo (Boca Raton Bowl)

Rankings

References

Liberty
Liberty Flames football seasons
Liberty Flames